Gibberifera clavata is a species of moth of the family Tortricidae. It is found in Tibet, China.

The wingspan is 15–17 mm. The ground colour of the forewings is light brown with a brown termen. The hindwings are grey.

Etymology
The species name refers to the uncus which is clubbed and unbifurcated apically in the male genitalia and is derived from Latin clavatus (meaning clubbed).

References

Moths described in 2004
Eucosmini